Kim Min-jun (born 22 March 1994), formerly known as Kim Dae-ho, is a South Korean footballer currently playing as a defender for Busan Transportation Corporation FC.

Career
Kim signed with Busan IPark on 23 December 2015 after impressing in an open try-out. He made his debut for the club in the first game of the 2016 K League Challenge season against Ansan.

Career statistics

Club

Notes

References

1994 births
Living people
University of Ulsan alumni
South Korean footballers
Association football defenders
Korea National League players
K League 1 players
K League 2 players
K3 League players
Busan IPark players
Gimhae FC players
Jeonnam Dragons players